"A Million Years" is a song recorded by Swedish singer Mariette. The song was released as a digital download in Sweden on 26 February 2017 and peaked at number 26 on the Swedish Singles Chart. It took part in Melodifestivalen 2017, where it placed fourth in the final, and also won the OGAE Second Chance Contest 2017 for Sweden. It was written by Thomas G:son, Johanna Jansson, Peter Boström, Mariette Hansson, Jenny Hansson.

Track listing

Chart performance

Release history

References

2016 songs
2017 singles
Melodifestivalen songs of 2017
Mariette Hansson songs
Songs written by Thomas G:son
Songs written by Peter Boström
Parlophone singles
Swedish pop songs
English-language Swedish songs
Songs written by Dotter (singer)